The Composer's Cut Series Vol. I: The Draughtsman's Contract is the 51st album by Michael Nyman, recorded in 2005 with the Michael Nyman Band and released in 2006.  It is the first in an unprecedented series in which Nyman began rerecording some of his film music independently of the needs of film production, and the culmination and refinement of 23 years of performances of the work since the recording of the original 1982 recording of The Draughtsman's Contract.

Nyman lamented that he had failed to have a sticker placed on the album noting that it contained all-new recordings, resulting in slow sales.

Track listing
The tracks are in a different order than they are on the soundtrack album.

Chasing sheep is best left to shepherds
The garden is becoming a robe room
An eye for optical theory
A watery death
The disposition of the linen
Queen of the night
Bravura in the face of grief

Personnel
The Michael Nyman Band:
Michael Nyman, piano, harpsichord, and conductor
Gabrielle Lester, violin
Catherine Thompson, violin
Kate Musker, viola
Tony Hinnigan, cello
David Roach, saxophones
Simon Haram, saxophones
Andrew Findon, saxophones
Martin Elliot, saxophones
Dave Lee, horn
Steve Sidwell, trumpet
Nigel Barr, bass trombone
Ian Humphries, Beverley Davison, Mia Cooper (violinist), Lizzie Bull, additional violins (track 2)

Note that of these players, only Nyman and Findon played on the original soundtrack recording.

produced by Michael Nyman
engineered and mixed by Austin Ince

References

2006 albums
Michael Nyman albums